Guainía may refer to:
 Guainía Department of Colombia
 Rio Negro (Amazon), known as Guainía River in Colombia
 Guaynia, southern coast of Puerto Rico in the pre-Columbian era